Vesaas is a surname. Notable people with the surname include:

Guri Vesaas (born 1939), Norwegian writer and translator
Halldis Moren Vesaas (1907–1995), Norwegian poet, writer and translator
Olav Vesaas (born 1935), Norwegian broadcasting journalist and writer
Tarjei Vesaas (1897–1970), Norwegian poet and writer